Hannah was built at Liverpool in 1797. She made three voyages as a slave ship in the triangular tradein enslaved people. She then made one voyage as a whaler in the British southern whale fishery. Next, she became a West Indiaman and was lost in 1811.

Career
Hannah first appeared in Lloyd's Register (LR) in 1797 with W.Stringer, master, R.Welsh, owner, and trade Liverpool–Africa.

1st enslaving voyage (1797–1798): Captain William Stringer acquired a letter of marque on 3 October 1797. He sailed from Liverpool on 6 November. Hannah commenced acquiring captives on 11 February 1798, first at Bonny Island and then at "Bomara". She arrived at Saint Croix on 15 May. She left St Croix on 21 June, and arrived back at Liverpool on 19 July.

At the time Saint Croix was a Danish colony. In 1792, the Danish government passed a law that would outlaw Danish participation in the trans-Atlantic enslaving trade, from early 1803 on. This led the government in the Danish West Indies to encourage the importation of captives prior to the ban taking effect. One measure that it took was to open the trade to foreign vessels. Records for the period 1796 to 1799 show that 24 British enslaving ships, most of them from Liverpool, arrived at St Croix and imported 6,781 captives.

2nd enslaving voyage (1798–1799): Captain James Good acquired a letter of marque on 14 August 1798. He sailed from Liverpool on 8 September 1798. Hannah acquired captives and arrived at St Croix on 6 April 1799. There she landed 320 captives. She left St Croix on 3 May and arrived back at Liverpool on 24 June. She had left Liverpool with 30 crew members and suffered four crew member deaths on the voyage..

3rd enslaving voyage (1799–1800): Captain Good sailed from Liverpool on 11 August 1799. Hannah arrived at Demerara on 5 March 1800 where she landed 303 captives. In her voyage she had left Liverpool with 30 crew members and she suffered 6 crew deaths on the voyage..

Whaling voyage (1803–1805): Hannah was valued at £5,000 in 1802. Captain Izzack Hullock (or Hullah, or Hilcock), sailed from London on 1 February 1803, bound for the Pacific. Hannah returned on 13 September 1805.

Although Lloyd's Register showed Hannah as continuing to whale, there is no supporting evidence in Lloyd's List ship arrival and departure data.

Fate
Hannah, Ellis, master, was wrecked on 29 January 1811 near the Isla of Pines, Cuba. She was sailing from Jamaica to London.

Citations

References
 
 

1797 ships
Age of Sail merchant ships of England
Liverpool slave ships
Whaling ships
Maritime incidents in 1811